The 546th Aircraft Control and Warning Group is an inactive United States Air Force unit. It was assigned to the 33d Air Division, stationed at Tinker Air Force Base, Oklahoma. It was inactivated on June 4,1951.

This command and control organization activated on March 19,1951 was responsible for the organization, manning, and equipping of new Aircraft Control and Warning (Radar) units.  It was dissolved, with the units being assigned directly to the 33d AD.

Components
 792d Aircraft Control and Warning Squadron
 Tinker AFB, Oklahoma, 16 March-4 June 1951
 793d Aircraft Control and Warning Squadron
 Hutchinson AFS, Kansas, 1 May-4 June 1951
 798th Aircraft Control and Warning Squadron
 Belleville AFS, Illinois, 1 May-4 June 1951

References

 
 Grant, C.L., The Development of Continental Air Defense to 1 September 1954, (1961), USAF Historical Study No. 126

External links

Aerospace Defense Command units
Air control groups of the United States Air Force
Military units and formations in Oklahoma
1951 establishments in Oklahoma
1951 disestablishments in Oklahoma